X.64 may refer to:
x86-64, a computer instruction set
ANSI X3.64, a standard for escape sequences